António José de Almeida was the 6th President of the Portuguese Republic, being the only president of the First Republic to complete his presidential term (1919-1923).

During his term he performed one official visit to the United States of Brazil, which celebrated the centenary of its independence in 1922.

1922

See also 
 List of international presidential trips made by Aníbal Cavaco Silva
 List of international presidential trips made by Bernardino Machado
 List of international presidential trips made by Francisco Craveiro Lopes
 List of international presidential trips made by Marcelo Rebelo de Sousa
 List of international presidential trips made by Mário Soares

References 

State visits
State visits by Portuguese presidents
20th century in international relations
Lists of diplomatic trips
Personal timelines